Aaron M. Frey (born c. 1978) is an American lawyer and politician serving as the 58th Attorney General of Maine since 2019. He formerly served as a Democratic representative in the Maine House of Representatives.

Early life and career 
Frey was born and raised in Dixmont, Maine. He is the son of Michael Frey and Cynthia Bean-Frey. Frey attended Saint Anselm College, where he served as student body president. He graduated from Saint Anselm with a Bachelor's degree in politics, and later received a Juris Doctor degree from Roger Williams University School of Law. He later started a law firm in Bangor. In 2012 he was elected to the Maine House of Representatives. From December 2014 until his resignation, he represented the 124th district, which includes parts of Bangor and Orono.

Maine Attorney General 
In December 2018, Democrats in the Maine Legislature chose Frey as their nominee for Maine Attorney General. Upon his nomination, he resigned his house seat to comply with a constitutional provision that prohibits state legislators from being elected to higher offices. He succeeded Janet Mills, who was elected Governor of Maine.

Upon taking office, Frey stated that he would consider involving Maine in multi-state lawsuits against pharmaceutical companies. He later joined a lawsuit accusing drug manufacturers of price inflation.

In February 2019, Frey became one of sixteen state attorneys general to join a lawsuit against the Trump administration over President Trump's decision to declare a national emergency. The emergency declaration was made to allow the President to allocate funding for a wall on the United States-Mexico border.

References

External links 

 Maine Attorney General government website
 Aaron Frey profile at Vote Smart
Aaron Frey profile at National Association of Attorneys General
Aaron Frey profile at Democratic Attorneys General Association

1970s births
Living people
21st-century American politicians
Maine Attorneys General
Democratic Party members of the Maine House of Representatives
Politicians from Bangor, Maine
Roger Williams University alumni
Saint Anselm College alumni
Year of birth missing (living people)